The Ministry of Finance and Revenue or Ministry of Finance (Wazarat-e-khazana, abbreviated as MoF) is a ministry of the Government of Pakistan tasked to ensure a strong Pakistani economy by developing policies of sound economic management and providing expert advice to the government.

Minister

The Minister of Finance is leading cabinet member who responsible each year for presenting the federal government's budget. It is one of the most important positions in the Cabinet. Because of the prominence and responsibility of this position, it is not uncommon for former Ministers of Finance to be appointed Prime Minister. The current Minister of Finance of Pakistan is Miftah Ismail, he was appointed to this position by the Prime minister of Pakistan on 19 April 2022. The previous Minister of Finance was Shaukat Tarin.

Divisions

Finance
The Finance Division comes under the supervision of the Secretary of Finance. The division's bureaucracy is divided into several wings and units, which include

 Human Resource Management Wing: Basic functions include the official business management of the organisation through the provision of effective human resource. The wing also provides logistic support to various other units of the organisation.
 Budget Wing: Basic functions include the coordination, preparation, printing and publishing of fiscal budgets and related documents for the federal government. The wing is also responsible for the implementation of the budgetary targets and preparing monthly reports thereon.
 Corporate Finance Wing: Basic functions include looking after the finance, financial, and corporate affairs of all Public Sector Entities (PSEs) that work under the administrative control of various federal ministries and their divisions.
 Economic Adviser's Wing: Basic functions include the publication of the Economic Survey of Pakistan, both in Urdu and English, prior to the announcement of the federal budget. The budgetary supplement evaluates the overall economic performance of the country based on various economic factors as evident in the preceding fiscal year's data.
 Expenditure Wing: Basic functions include the revision and finalisation of the federal budget, enforcement of economic measures and disbursements of pension funds.
 External Finance Wing: Basic functions include the arrangement of economical from international financial institutions for balance of payments and budgetary support. The EF wing also allocates and utilises the foreign exchange and releases and maintains the funds for both civil departments and the armed forces.
 External Finance Policy Wing: Basic functions include the compilation of the Pakistan government's principal policy for macroeconomic governance and poverty reduction. The EFP wing also deals with multilateral and bilateral institutions like the World Bank, Department for International Development (DFID), Citizens Damage Compensation Programme (CDCP), SAARC Development Fund (SDF), ECO Trade and Development Bank, United Nations Development Programme (UNDP), Strengthening Poverty Reduction Strategy Monitoring Project (SPRSMP), Pakistan One UN Programme and the Joint Ministerial Commissions (JMCs/JECs).
 Economic Reforms Unit: Basic functions include the formulation of development strategies for the private sector and reviewing law, rules and regulations, pertaining to business environment that are obsolete, overlapping and inconsistent or unduly add to the cost of doing business.
 Military Wing: Basic functions include procurement of all defence equipment for the Ministry of Defence (MoD) and the Ministry of Defence Production (MoDP). The wing also prepares, executes and monitors the budget and expenditure of the armed forces, MoD, MoDP, inter-services organisations and defence production establishments.
 Development Wing
 Internal Finance Wing
 Investment Wing
 Provincial Finance Wing
 Regulations Wing

Revenue

The Revenue Division comes under the supervision of the Federal Secretary for Revenue, who is usually the chairman of the Federal Board of Revenue.

Economic Affairs
The Economic Affairs Division comes under the supervision of the Pakistan Secretary of Economic Affairs; and is responsible for assessing, programming and negotiations of external economic assistance concerning the government and its constituent units from foreign governments and multilateral agencies. Among its various functions are the management of external debt, provision of technical assistance to foreign countries, lending and re-lending of foreign loans, and monitoring of aid utilisation.

Departments
 Accountant General Pakistan Revenues
 Auditor General of Pakistan
 Competition Commission of Pakistan
 Controller General of Accounts
 Directorate General of Intelligence and Investigation
 Financial Monitoring Unit
 National Savings Organization
 Pakistan Mint
 Securities and Exchange Commission of Pakistan

See also 
 Economic Coordination Committee
 Ministry of Commerce & Textiles
 Pakistan Board of Investment
 Trading Corporation of Pakistan

References

External links
 Finance Ministry
 Finance Division
 Revenue Division
 Board of Investment

Economy of Pakistan
Government finances in Pakistan
1947 establishments in Pakistan
Ministries established in 1947